Cowan Cowan is an island town and locality in the City of Brisbane, Queensland, Australia.

History 
In the 2011 census, Moreton Island (including Cowan Cowan) had a population of 297 people.

In the  the locality of Cowan Cowan had a population of 28 people.

Heritage listings
Cowan Cowan has a number of heritage-listed sites, including:
 25 Dorothy Newnham Street: Signal Station, Moreton Island
 30 Jessie Wadsworth Street: Fort Cowan Cowan (Cowan Cowan Battery)

Education
There are no schools in Cowan Cowan, nor any nearby. Distance education and boarding schools are options.

Amenities
There are a number of parks in the area:
 Kakoogun Kin-dapin Reserve at 2A Dorothy Newnham Street
 Unnamed park at 30 Jessie Wadsworth Street

Attractions
Just south of Cowan Cowan is the Cowan Cowan Point Light.

References

External links 

 
 

Suburbs of the City of Brisbane
Towns in Queensland
Moreton Island
Localities in Queensland